Pterophylla is the scientific name of two genera of organisms and may refer to:

Pterophylla (katydid), a genus of katydids in the family Tettigoniidae
Pterophylla (plant), a genus of plants in the family Cunoniaceae